Walter Henry Jennings (1 April 1909 – 4 November 1993) was an English footballer who played as a right half. He made over 150 Football League appearances in the years before the Second World War.

Career
Wally Jennings played locally for South Bristol Central Old Boys and had trials with Bristol Rovers & Blackburn Rovers. Alex Raisbeck signed Jennings in May 1928 for Bristol City. Jennings moved to Cardiff City in June 1933. Jennings later played for Bath City, Cheltenham Town and Bristol St George. After retiring from playing Wally Jennings was a scout for Everton, Bristol Rovers and Bath City.

References

1909 births
1993 deaths
Footballers from Bristol
English footballers
Association football wing halves
English Football League players
Southern Football League players
Cardiff City F.C. players
Cheltenham Town F.C. players
Bristol City F.C. players
Bath City F.C. players